Anargha Nimisham (Invaluable Moment) is a collection of short stories by Vaikom Muhammad Basheer published in 1946. Unlike other works by Basheer which are filled with humour and satire, stories of Anargha Nimisham mostly deal with philosophical and spiritual aspects.

List of stories
 "Anargha Nimisham"
 "Jeevitham"
 "Mangalaashamsakal"
 "Sandhyapranamam"
 "Yuddham Avasanikkanamenkil"
 "Vishudharomam"
 "Poonilavil"
 "Anal Haq"
 "Ekanthathayude Mahatheeram"
 "Ajnathamaya Bhaviyilekk"

References

See also
 Anal Haq

1946 short story collections
Short story collections by Vaikom Muhammad Basheer
Malayalam-language books
Malayalam short stories